The 2010 IFAF Women's World Championship was the first world championship of American football for women. It was held in Stockholm, Sweden, from 26 June to 3 July 2010.

Seeding
 1. 
 2. 
 3. 
 4. 
 5. 
 6.

Group stage

Group A

Group B

5th place

3rd place

Final

Final standings

References

External links
 Official Site

Foo
IFAF Women's World Championship
International sports competitions in Stockholm
2010s in Stockholm
2010 in American football
International sports competitions hosted by Sweden
June 2010 sports events in Europe
July 2010 sports events in Europe